Archeio-Marxism was a radical left political movement that was active in interwar Greece. The main motto of its supporters was "first education and then action" and they were against mass demonstrations and unionism. They were named after the Archive of Marxism magazine, that was published in 1921. 

From 1930 to 1934, the organization was a member of Trotsky's International Left Opposition, renaming itself officially as the Bolshevist–Leninist Organization of Greece – Archeio-Marxists (Κομμουνιστική Οργάνωση Μπολσεβίκων Λενινιστών Ελλάδας - Αρχειομαρξιστών). With some 2,000 members, it constituted the ILO's largest member group, and its leader, Dimitris Giotopoulos (alias: "Witte") occupied an important position in its secretariat. 

Following Giotopoulos' quarrel with Trotsky in 1933-1934, the Archeio-Marxists left the ILO, and by the late 1930s, they became affiliated with the so-called "London Bureau", having formed the Communist Archio-Marxist Party of Greece. The organization survived the repression of the Metaxas Regime, but its members came under increasing attack from both right-wing groups and the KKE-led EAM-ELAS resistance front at the end of World War II and during the Greek Civil War.

References 
  ΣΠΑΡΤΑΚΟΣ, Κείμενα 1930-1932 - Εκδόσεις «Ουτοπία», Αθήνα, Δεκέμβρης 1986
 

1920s in Greece
1930s in Greece
Marxist organizations
Political history of Greece
Trotskyist organizations in Greece
Right Opposition
History of Greece (1924–1941)